La Fortuna is a district of the San Carlos canton, in the Alajuela province of Costa Rica.

Toponymy 
"La Fortuna" is Spanish for "The Fortune", and aptly named due its ample supply of tourist attractions and extremely fertile lands. Although there is a common myth that the town got its name due to its sparing from the Arenal Volcano's eruptions, the town actually got its name before the latest eruption cycle and was named for the fertile lands ("The Fortune") where it is located.

History 
La Fortuna was created on 5 February 1952 by Decreto Ejecutivo 15.

Originally called "El Burío", La Fortuna was founded in the mid 1930s by settlers that came from Ciudad Quesada, Grecia (canton), Alajuela and other parts of the region. In 1968, the Arenal Volcano erupted to the west, causing extensive damage and casualties, including 82 deaths. The eruption did not reach the village of La Fortuna. This catastrophe, nonetheless, changed the geography of the whole region, making it one of the most visited tourist destinations of Costa Rica.

The town and surrounding province was founded by a small group of people, namely Elias Kooper, Alberto Quesada, Jose Garro, Rufino and Isolina Quesada, Juana Vargas Ricardo Quiros, Juan Ledesma, Red Porfirio, and Julio Murillo. This group and a few others were dedicated to the cultivating of the land and are largely responsible for its development.

Geography 
La Fortuna has an area of  km² and an elevation of  metres.

Arenal Volcano
Arenal is often cited by scientists as being in the top 10 or top 20 of the world's most active volcanoes.

Cerro Chato 
The Cerro Chato, also known as the Chato Volcano is a dormant volcano that first erupted 38,000 years ago and last erupted 3,500 years ago. One of its eruptions paved the way for the nearby La Fortuna Waterfall. Cerro Chato has two peaks, Chatito (little Chato) and Espina (Thorn), as well as a 1,640-ft (500-m) crater filled with green water. Classified as a difficult hike and at times a "climb," it is recommended only for hikers of good physical condition. The average hike lasts 5 hours, and can be very muddy when it rains. Due to certain minerals in the water, some advise no swimming, however most locals disagree and swim in it regardless.

Demographics 

For the 2011 census, La Fortuna had a population of  inhabitants. 

There are 9 small communities with a total of 15,383 inhabitants, making it the fourth most populated district of the canton, just behind the districts of Quesada, Aguas Zarcas (es), and Pital.

Transportation

Road transportation 
The district is covered by the following road routes:
 National Route 4
 National Route 141
 National Route 142
 National Route 702
 National Route 936

Tourism
In addition to the volcanoes, La Fortuna has tourist attractions such as the  La Catarata de la Fortuna waterfall, several resorts with natural hot springs temperate enough to bathe in, other day spa services, and day-trips that involve horseback riding, whitewater rafting, hanging bridges, a "sky tram," zip-lines, mountain biking, kayaking, stand-up paddleboards, ATV or dirt bike rentals, "butterfly farms," the Venado Cavern tours, bungee jumping, Laguna Cedeno, El Salto Swimming Hole, and canyoneering.

Transportation
There are a few taxis in the town that can be called if needed, but most tourism companies provide their own means of transportation. Additionally, there are car rental locations and even ATV's and dirt bikes if one wishes to go off-roading.

Hot Springs

Throughout La Fortuna we can find several natural hot springs with temperatures ranging from 30° to 50° Celsius, which emanate from the depths of the volcano through rivers located in the earth’s crust. Arenal Volcano naturally heats the water of many, such as Tabacon River, Ecotermales Hot Springs, and hot springs located on hotel property such as Titokú of Kioro, Arenal Paraiso, Royal Corin, Los Lagos pools, and Baldi Hot Springs. There are also other hot water sources that are either not currently being exploited for tourism, or are being so in an incipient manner.

Climate
Due to being in the tropics, the climate of La Fortuna and Costa Rica in general does not vary greatly like those areas in the temperate zones. The four seasons are not all experienced in La Fortuna, which means one can expect close to 12 hours of daylight at any time of the year. The biggest changes in temperature are the effect of the wet and dry seasons. With the dry season being more subject to direct and intense sunlight, there is a resulting higher average temperature of above 25 C (77 F). The wet season, however, usually includes higher levels of humidity which may be perceived as very warm. The annual average temperature in La Fortuna is between 20 C and 26 C (68 F to 78 F).

Medical Care and Local Business
La Fortuna has a medical clinic, but serious injuries may require a medical evacuation. La Fortuna also has a veterinary clinic, dentist office, police station, gas station, 3 banks, 3 groceries, restaurants (in addition to those in the resorts), a post office, thrift shops, clothing stores, and a hardware store.

References 

Districts of Alajuela Province
Populated places in Alajuela Province
Tourism in Costa Rica